Dew-Scented was a German thrash and death metal band. They have released eight studio albums and were last signed to Metal Blade Records (Europe) and Prosthetic Records (USA/North America). Their name is inspired by the writings of Edgar Allan Poe.

Biography
Vocalist Leif Jensen entered the band in 1992, drummer Uwe Werning 1997 and guitarist Hendrik Bache in autumn 2001.

In winter 1992/1993, the north German band brought out their first demo "Symbolization", which was very well known in the underground scene and helped them to land their record deal with SPV / Steamhammer.

In the spring of 1996 they released their debut album, Immortelle. They toured with Edge of Sanity, Lake Of Tears and Sadist. Due to the increased band activity, there were some changes in the line-up. In 1998, they joined the label Grind Syndicate Media / NBR and released their second album Innoscent. In the same year they played for the first time at the Wacken Open Air.

In the summer of 1999 they released Ill-Natured which was a mixture of death and thrash metal. Two years later, the album Inwards was released, which they worked on with Andy Classen. To promote the album, they played on various festivals and along many German thrash metal bands such as Kreator, Sodom and Destruction. For the first time they toured in the United States of America.

The release of the 2003 album Impact and the double album Ill-Natured & Innoscent, released under the German label Nuclear Blast, established the band as an accomplished thrash metal act and a lot of people drew comparisons between them and Slayer.

Issue VI, the sixth album, was released in June 2005. The Limited Edition included the video for 'Turn To Ash' and 17 live songs, recorded between 2002 and 2005. On 30 March 2007 the new album Incinerate was released in Europe and on April 3 in North America.

Dew Scented released their ninth album, Intermination on June 30, 2015 via Prosthetic Records.

On May 17, 2018, the band announced they had broken up due to conflicting schedules with band members' personal lives.

Members

Final lineup
Leif Jensen – vocals (1992–2018)
Marvin Vriesde – guitars (2005, 2012–2018)
Rory Hansen – guitars (2012–2018)
Joost van der Graaf – bass (2012–2018)
Koen Herfst – drums (2012–2018)

Former members
Jörg Szittnick – guitar (1992–1996)
Tarek Stinshoff – drums (1992–1996)
Ralf Klein – guitar (1996–1998)
Patrick Heims – bass (1996–2003)
Uwe Werning – drums (1997–2007)
Florian Müller – guitar (1998–2008)
Hendrik Bache – guitar (2001–2008)
Alexander Pahl – bass (2003–2011)
Michael Borchers – guitar (2008–2012)
Marc-Andree Dieken – drums (2008–2012)
Martin Walczak – guitar (2008–2010)

Timeline

Discography

Studio albums
Immortelle (1996)
Innoscent (1998)
Ill-Natured (1999)
Inwards (2002)
Impact (2003)
Issue VI (2005)
Incinerate (2007)
Invocation (2010)
Icarus (2012)
Intermination (2015)

Other releases
Symbolization (1994, demo)
Insurgent (2013, compilation)

References

External links

 
 
 Dew-Scented at Encyclopaedia Metallum

German thrash metal musical groups
Musical groups established in 1992
Nuclear Blast artists
Musicians from Braunschweig
Metal Blade Records artists